The women's pairs competition of the bowling events at the 2011 Pan American Games took place between from October 24 to 25 at the Bolearmo Tapatio.

The participants each bowled a total of twelve games, six on each day. At the end of play, the scores were totalled and averaged, and the pair with the highest grand total won the gold medal.

Results

References
Final Results

Bowling at the 2011 Pan American Games